Cochliopidae is a family of small freshwater snails with gills and an operculum, aquatic gastropod mollusks. 

Paludestrina d'Orbigny, 1840 is an archaic  synonym, and has been placed on the Official Index of Rejected and Invalid Names by ICZN Opinion 2202.

This family is in the superfamily Truncatelloidea and in the order Littorinimorpha (according to the taxonomy of the Gastropoda by Bouchet & Rocroi, 2005).

Description 
Cochliopidae snails are characterized by sharp, elongated spire-like structures, and can  be found in rivers or brackish water.

2005 taxonomy 
The family Cochliopidae consists of 3 subfamilies (according to the taxonomy of the Gastropoda by Bouchet & Rocroi, 2005):
Cochliopinae Tryon, 1866 - synonyms: Mexithaumatinae D. W. Taylor, 1966, Paludiscalinae D. W. Taylor, 1966
Littoridininae Thiele, 1928
Semisalsinae Guiusti & Pezzoli, 1980 - synonym: Heleobiini Bernasconi, 1991

Genera 
Liu et al. (2001) have recognized 34 genera with more than 260 species within the subfamily Cochliopinae.

Strong et al. (2008) have recognized 246 freshwater species within Cochliopidae.

Genera within the family Cochliopidae include:

subfamily Cochliopinae
Aphaostracon F. G. Thompson, 1968
Coahuilix Taylor, 1966
Cochliopa Stimpson, 1865 - type genus of the family Cochliopidae
Cochliopina Morrison, 1946

subfamily Littoridininae
Antrobia Hubricht, 1971 - with the only species Antrobia culveri Hubricht, 1971 - Tumbling Creek cavesnail
Littoridina Souleyet, 1852
Pseudotryonia Hershler, 2001
Pseudotryonia adamantina
Pseudotryonia alamosae
Pseudotryonia brevissima
Pseudotryonia grahamae
Pseudotryonia mica Hershler, Liu & Landye, 2011
Pseudotryonia pasajae Hershler, Liu & Landye, 2011

subfamily Semisalsinae - there are three genera in the subfamily Semisalsinae
Heleobia Stimpson, 1865
Heleobops Thompson, 1968
Semisalsa Radoman, 1974

subfamily ? (either Cochliopinae or Littoridininae)
Aroapyrgus H. B. Baker, 1931
Balconorbis Hershler & Longley, 1986
† Carinulorbis Yen, 1949 
Chorrobius Hershler, Liu & Landye, 2011
Dyris Conrad, 1871 - it has extant species and also 26 species in Miocene Pebas Formation
Emmericiella Pilsbry, 1909
Eremopyprgus Hershler, 1999
† Feliconcha Wesselingh, Anderson & Kadolsky, 2006 - two species from Miocene of the Pebas Formation
Feliconcha feliconcha Wesselingh, Anderson & Kadolsky, 2006
Feliconcha reticulata Wesselingh, Anderson & Kadolsky, 2006
(probably extant) Glabertryonia Wesselingh, Anderson & Kadolsky, 2006 - three species
† Glabertryonia glabra Wesselingh, Anderson & Kadolsky, 2006 - from Miocene of the Pebas Formation
† Glabertryonia sp. 1 - from Pliocene of the Las Piedras Formation
(probably extant) Glabertryonia sp. 2 - from Holocene of Surinam, probably extant
Juturnia Hershler, Liu & Stockwell, 2002
Lithococcus Pilsbry, 1911
Mesobia F. G. Thompson & Hershler, 1991
Mexipyrgus Taylor, 1966
Minckleyella Hershler, Liu & Landye, 2011 - with the only species Minckleyella balnearis Hershler, Liu & Landye, 2011
 Onobops Thompson, 1968
 Pyrgophorus Ancey, 1888
 Sioliella Haas, 1949
 Spurwinkia Davis, Mazurkiewicz & Mandracchia, 1982
 Texadina Abbott & Ladd, 1951
 Thalassobia Bourguignat in Mabille, 1877

Cladogram 
A cladogram based on sequences of mitochondrial cytochrome-c oxidase I (COI) genes showing phylogenic relations of species within Cochliopidae:

{{clade
|label1=Cochliopidae
|1={{clade
   |1={{clade
      |1={{clade
         |1=Onobops jacksoni
         |2=Heleobops docimus, Heleobops dalmatica         }}
      |2=
      }}
   |2="Tryonia" robusta
   }}
}}

References

 Further reading 
 Hershler R., Davis C. L., Kitting C. L & Liu H.-P. (2007). "Discovery of introduced and cryptogenic cochliopid gastropods in the San Francisco Estuary, California". Journal of Molluscan Studies 73(4): 323-332. PDF.
 Hershler R. & Thompson F. G. (1992). "A Review of the Aquatic Gastropod Subfamily Cochliopinae (Prosobranchia: Hydrobiidae)". Malacological Review'', Supplement 5: 1-140. pages 16–18.
  Wilke T., Haase M., Hershler R., Liu H.-P., Misof B. & Ponder W. (2013) Pushing short DNA fragments to the limit: Phylogenetic relationships of ‘hydrobioid’ gastropods (Caenogastropoda: Rissooidea). Molecular Phylogenetics and Evolution, 66: 715-736

External links 

 Cochliopidae on WoRMS